This is a timeline of Airbnb, a company that brokers private lodging rentals through its website.

Timeline

References

Airbnb